comprise ethnic Koreans who have permanent residency status in Japan or who have become Japanese citizens, and whose immigration to Japan originated before 1945, or who are descendants of those immigrants. They are a group distinct from South Korean nationals who have emigrated to Japan after the end of World War II and the division of Korea.

They currently constitute the second largest ethnic minority group in Japan after Chinese immigrants, due to many Koreans assimilating into the general Japanese population. The term Zainichi Korean refers only to long-term Korean residents of Japan who trace their roots to Korea under Japanese rule, distinguishing them from the later wave of Korean migrants who came mostly in the 1980s, and from pre-modern immigrants dating back to antiquity who may themselves be the ancestors of the Japanese people.

The Japanese word "Zainichi" itself means a foreign citizen "staying in Japan", and implies temporary residence. Nevertheless, the term "Zainichi Korean" is used to describe settled permanent residents of Japan, both those who have retained their Joseon or North Korean/South Korean nationalities, and, even, sometimes, but not always, includes Japanese citizens of Korean descent who acquired Japanese nationality by naturalization or by birth from one or both parents who have Japanese citizenship.

Statistics

In 2019, there were over 824,977 ethnic Koreans resident in Japan. According to the Ministry of Justice, 412,340 South Koreans and 25,871  (those "Koreans" do not necessarily have the North Korean nationality) are registered in 2022.

History

Overview
The modern flow of Koreans to Japan started with the Japan-Korea Treaty of 1876 and increased dramatically after 1920. During World War II, a large number of Koreans were also conscripted by Japan. Another wave of migration started after South Korea was devastated by the Korean War in the 1950s. Also noteworthy was the large number of refugees from the massacres on Jeju Island by the South Korean government.

Statistics regarding Zainichi immigration are scarce. However, in 1988, a Mindan youth group called Zainihon Daikan Minkoku Seinendan published a report titled "Father, tell us about that day. Report to reclaim our history" The report included a survey of first generation Koreans' reasons for immigration. The result was 13.3% for conscription, 39.6% for economics, 17.3% for marriage and family, 9.5% for study/academic, 20.2% for other reasons and 0.2% unknown. The survey excluded those who were under 12 when they arrived in Japan.

Pre-modern era
While some families today can ultimately trace their ancestry to Korean immigrants, they were absorbed into Japanese society and are not considered a distinct group. The same is applicable to those families descended from Koreans who entered Japan in subsequent pre-modern periods. Trade with Korea continued to modern times, with Japan also periodically receiving missions from Korea, though this activity was often limited to specific ports.

Yayoi period
In late prehistory, in the Iron Age Yayoi period (300 BC to 300 AD), Japanese culture  some Korean influence, though whether this was accompanied by immigration from Korea is debated (see Origin of the Yayoi people).

Kofun period (250 to 538) 
In the later Kofun (250–538) and Asuka (538–710) periods there was some flow of people from the Korean Peninsula, both as immigrants and long-term visitors, notably a number of clans in the Kofun period (see Kofun period#Korean migration). While some families today can ultimately trace their ancestry to the immigrants, they were absorbed into Japanese society and are not considered a distinct group.

Heian period (794 to 1185) 
In the records from Nihon Kōki, in the year 814, six people, including a Silla man called Karanunofurui (Korean: 가라포고이, Japanese: 加羅布古伊; presumed to be of gaya descent) became naturalized in Japan's Minokuni (美濃國) region.

Sengoku period (1467 to 1615) 
Some Koreans entered Japan in captivity as a result of pirate raids or during the 1592-1598 Japanese invasions of Korea.

Edo period (1603 to 1867) 
In the Edo period, trade with Korea occurred through the Tsushima-Fuchū Domain in Kyūshū, near Nagasaki.

Before World War II
After the conclusion of the Japan-Korea Treaty of 1876, Korean students and asylum seekers started to come to Japan, including Bak Yeonghyo, Kim Ok-gyun, and Song Byeong-jun. There were about 800 Koreans living in Japan before Japan annexed Korea. In 1910, as the result of the Japan–Korea Annexation Treaty, Japan annexed Korea and all Korean people became part of the nation of the Empire of Japan by law and received Japanese citizenship.

In the 1920s, the demand for labor in Japan was high while Koreans had difficulty finding jobs in the Korean peninsula. Thousands of Koreans migrated or were recruited to work in industries like coal mining. A majority of the immigrants consisted of farmers from the southern part of Korea. The number of Koreans in Japan in 1930 was more than ten times greater than that of 1920, reaching 419,000. However, the jobs they could get on the mainland of Japan were curtailed by open discrimination and largely limited to physical labor due to their poor education; they usually worked alongside other groups of ethnic minorities subject to discrimination, such as burakumin.

Before World War II, the Japanese government tried to reduce the number of Koreans immigrating to Japan. To accomplish this, the Japanese government devoted resources to the Korean peninsula.

During World War II

In 1939, the Japanese government introduced the National Mobilization Law and conscripted Koreans to deal with labor shortages due to World War II. In 1944, the Japanese authorities extended the mobilization of Japanese civilians for labor on the Korean peninsula. Of the 5,400,000 Koreans conscripted, about 670,000 were taken to mainland Japan (including Karafuto Prefecture [present-day Sakhalin, now part of Russia]) for civilian labor. Those who were brought to Japan were forced to work in factories, in mines, and as laborers, often under appalling conditions. About 60,000 are estimated to have died between 1939 and 1945. Most of the wartime laborers returned home after the war, but some elected to remain in Japan. 43,000 of those in Karafuto, which had been occupied by the Soviet Union just prior to Japan's surrender, were refused repatriation to either mainland Japan or the Korean Peninsula, and were thus trapped in Sakhalin, stateless; they became the ancestors of the Sakhalin Koreans.

After World War II
Koreans entered Japan illegally post-World War II due to an unstable political and economic situation in Korea, with 20,000 to 40,000 Koreans fleeing Syngman Rhee's forces during the Jeju uprising in 1948. The Yeosu-Suncheon rebellion also increased the illegal immigration to Japan. It is estimated that between 1946 and 1949, 90% of illegal immigrants to Japan were Koreans.  During the Korean War, Korean immigrants came to Japan to avoid torture or murder at the hands of dictator Syngman Rhee's forces (e.g. Bodo League massacre).

Fishers and brokers helped immigrants enter Japan through Tsushima Island. In the 1950s, Japan Coast Guard secured the border with Korea, but apprehending illegal immigrants was difficult because they were armed while Japan Coast Guard was not due to the terms of the surrender of Japan after World War II. During this period, one-fifth of the immigrants were arrested.

In Official Correspondence of 1949, Shigeru Yoshida, the prime minister of Japan, proposed the deportation of all Zainichi Koreans to Douglas MacArthur and said the Japanese government would pay all of the cost. Yoshida stated that it was unfair for Japan to purchase food for illegal Zainichi Koreans, claiming that they did not contribute to the Japanese economy and that they supposedly committed political crimes by cooperating with communists.

Loss of Japanese nationality

Immediately following the end of World War II, there were roughly 2.4 million Koreans in Japan; the majority repatriated to their ancestral homes in the southern half of the Korean Peninsula, leaving only 650,000 in Japan by 1946.

Japan's defeat in the war and the end of its colonization of the Korean Peninsula and Taiwan left the nationality status of Koreans and Taiwanese in an ambiguous position in terms of law. The Alien Registration Ordinance (Gaikokujin-tōroku-rei) of 2 May 1947 ruled that Koreans and some Taiwanese were to be provisionally treated as foreign nationals. Given the lack of a single, unified government on the Korean Peninsula, Koreans were provisionally registered under the name of Joseon (Korean: , Japanese: Chōsen), the old name of undivided Korea.

In 1948, the northern and southern parts of Korea declared independence individually, making Joseon, or the old undivided Korea, a defunct nation. The new government of the Republic of Korea (South Korea) made a request to the Supreme Commander of the Allied Powers, then the occupying power of Japan, to change the nationality registration of Zainichi Koreans to Daehan Minguk (Japanese: Daikan Minkoku), the official name of the new nation. Following this, from 1950 onwards, Zainichi Koreans were allowed to voluntarily re-register their nationality as such.

The Allied occupation of Japan ended on 28 April 1952 with the San Francisco Peace Treaty, in which Japan formally abandoned its territorial claim to the Korean Peninsula, and as a result, Zainichi Koreans formally lost their Japanese nationality.

The division on the Korean Peninsula led to division among Koreans in Japan. Following the May Day riots of 1952, the pro-North organisation was made illegal, but it re-formed under various guises and went on to form the "General Association of Korean Residents in Japan", or Chongryon, in 1955. This organisation kept to its socialist, and by extension pro-North stance, and enjoyed the active financial support of the North Korean government.

In 1965, Japan concluded a Treaty on Basic Relations with the Republic of Korea and recognized the South Korean government as the only legitimate government of the peninsula. Those Koreans in Japan who did not apply for South Korean citizenship kept Chōsen-seki which did not give them citizenship of any nation.

Newcomers

Starting in 1980, South Korea allowed its students to study abroad freely; starting in 1987 people older than forty-four were allowed to travel abroad. One year after the Seoul Olympics, traveling abroad was further liberalized. When Expo 2005 was held, the Japanese government had a visa waiver program with South Korea for a limited period under the condition that the visitor's purpose was sightseeing or business, and later extended it permanently.

Repatriation to Korea

Repatriation of Zainichi Koreans from Japan conducted under the auspices of the Japanese Red Cross began to receive official support from the Japanese government as early as 1956. A North Korean-sponsored repatriation programme with support of the Chōsen Sōren (The General Association of Korean Residents in Japan) officially began in 1959. In April 1959,  ( Terao Gorō), a political activist and historian of the Japanese Communist Party, published a book North of the 38th Parallel, in which he praised North Korea for its rapid development and humanitarianism; numbers of returnees skyrocketed. The Japanese government was in favour of repatriation as a way to rid the country of ethnic minority residents that were discriminated against and regarded as incompatible with Japanese culture. Though the United States government was initially unaware of Tokyo's cooperation with the repatriation programme, they offered no objection after they were informed of it; the US ambassador to Japan was quoted by his Australian counterpart as describing the Koreans in Japan as "a poor lot including many Communists and many criminals".

Despite the fact that 97% of the Zainichi Koreans originated from the southern half of the Korean Peninsula, the North was initially a far more popular destination for repatriation than the South. Approximately 70,000 Zainichi repatriated to North Korea during a two-year period from 1960 through 1961. However, as word came back of difficult conditions in the North and with the 1965 normalization of Japan-South Korea relations, the popularity of repatriation to the North dropped sharply, though the trickle of returnees to the North continued as late as 1984. In total, 93,340 people migrated from Japan to North Korea under the repatriation programme; an estimated 6,000 were Japanese migrating with Korean spouses. Around one hundred such repatriates are believed to have later escaped from North Korea; the most famous is Kang Chol-Hwan, who published a book about his experience, The Aquariums of Pyongyang. One returnee who later defected back to Japan, known only by his Japanese pseudonym Kenki Aoyama, worked for North Korean intelligence as a spy in Beijing.

The repatriations have been the subject of numerous creative works in Japan, due to the influence they had on the Zainichi Korean community; One documentary film about a family whose sons repatriated while the parents and daughter remained in Japan, Dear Pyongyang, won a special jury prize at the 2006 Sundance Film Festival.

Some Zainichi Koreans have gone to South Korea to study or to settle. For example, author Lee Yangji studied at Seoul National University in the early 1980s.

Korean organizations in Japan – Chongryon and Mindan

Division between Chongryon and Mindan
Out of the two Korean organizations in Japan, the pro-North Chongryon has been the more militant in terms of retaining Koreans' ethnic identity. Its policies included:
 Operation of about 60 ethnic Korean schools across Japan, initially partly funded by the North Korean government, in which lessons were conducted in Korean. They maintain a strong pro-North Korean ideology, which has sometimes come under criticism from pupils, parents, and the public alike.
 Discouraging its members from taking up Japanese citizenship.
 Discouraging its members from marrying Japanese.
 Chongryon-operated businesses and banks to provide the necessary jobs, services, and social networks for Zainichi Koreans outside mainstream society.
 Opposition to Zainichi Koreans' right to vote or participation in Japanese elections, which they saw as an unacceptable attempt at assimilation into Japanese society.
 A home-coming movement to North Korea in the late 1950s, which it hailed as a socialist "Paradise on Earth". Some 90,000 Zainichi Koreans and their Japanese spouses moved to the North before the migration eventually died down.

Well into at least the 1970s, Chongryon was the dominant Zainichi group, and in some ways remains more politically significant today in Japan. However, the widening disparity between the political and economic conditions of the two Koreas has since made Mindan, the pro-South Korean group, the larger and less politically controversial faction. 65% of Zainichi are now said to be affiliated to Mindan. The number of pupils receiving ethnic education from Chongryon-affiliated schools has declined sharply, with many, if not most, Zainichi now opting to send their children to mainstream Japanese schools. Some Chongryon schools have been closed for lack of funding, and there is serious doubt as to the continuing viability of the system as a whole (Mindan has also traditionally operated a school system for the children of its members, although it has always been less widespread and organized compared to its Chongryon counterpart, and is said to be nearly defunct at the present time).

Controversies over Chongryon

For a long time, Chongryon enjoyed unofficial immunity from searches and investigations, partly because authorities were reluctant to carry out any actions which could provoke not only accusations of xenophobia but lead to an international incident. Chongryon has long been suspected of a variety of criminal acts on behalf of North Korea, such as illegal transfer of funds to North Korea and espionage, but no action was taken. However, recent escalating tensions between Japan and North Korea over a number of issues, namely North Korea's abduction of Japanese nationals which came to light in 2002 as well as its nuclear weapons program, has led to a resurgence of public animosity against Chongryon. Chongryon schools have alleged numerous cases of verbal abuse and physical violence directed against their students and buildings, and Chongryon facilities have been targets of protests and occasional incidents. The Japanese authorities have recently started to crack down on Chongryon, with investigations and arrests for charges ranging from tax evasion to espionage. These moves are usually criticized by Chongryon as acts of political suppression.

In December 2001, police raided Chongryon's Tokyo headquarters and related facilities to investigate Chongryon officials' suspected role in embezzlement of funds from the failed .

In 2002, Shotaro Tochigi, deputy head of the Public Security Investigation Agency told a session of the House of Representatives Financial Affairs Committee that the agency was investigating Chongryon for suspected illicit transfers of funds to the North. The image of Chongryon was further tarnished by North Korea's surprise 2002 admission that it had indeed abducted Japanese nationals in the 1970s, as it had been categorically and fiercely denying for many years that the abductions had ever taken place and dismissing rumors of North Korean involvement as an allegedly "racist fantasy." Some of the recent drop in membership of Chongryon is thought to be attributed to ordinary members of Chongryon who had believed the party line feeling deeply humiliated and disillusioned upon discovering that they had been used as mouthpieces to deny the crimes of the North Korean government.

In March 2006, police raided six Chongryon-related facilities in an investigation into the circumstances surrounding the June 1980 disappearance of one of the alleged abductees, Tadaaki Hara. Police spokesman said that the head of Chongryon at the time is suspected of co-operating in his kidnapping.

The operation of the Mangyongbong-92 (currently suspended), a North Korean ferry that is the only regular direct link between North Korea and Japan, is a subject of significant tension, as the ferry is primarily used by Chongryon to send its members to North Korea and to supply North Korea with money and goods donated by the organization and its members. In 2003, a North Korean defector made a statement to the US Senate committee stating that more than 90% of the parts used by North Korea to construct its missiles were brought from Japan aboard the ship.

In May 2006, Chongryon and the pro-South Mindan agreed to reconcile, only for the agreement to break down the following month. North Korea's missile tests in July 2006 have deepened the divide, with Chongryon refusing to condemn the missile tests, expressing only its regret that the Japanese government has suspended the operation of the Mangyongbong-92. Outraged senior Mindan officials joined mainstream Japanese politicians and media in sharply criticizing Chongryon's silence over the matter.

Integration into Japanese society

During the post-World War II period, Zainichi Koreans faced various kinds of discrimination from Japanese society. Due to the San Francisco Peace Treaty, the Japanese government created laws to support Japanese citizens by giving financial support, providing shelters, etc. However, after the treaty was signed, Zainichi Koreans were no longer counted as Japanese citizens, so they were unable to get any support from the government. They were unable to get an insurance certificate from the government, so it was difficult for them to get any medical care. Without medical insurance, Zainichi Koreans were unable to go to hospital since the cost of medication was too high.

Another problem caused by this treaty was that the Japanese government created a law which stated that Korean residents in Japan had to be fingerprinted since Zainichi Koreans had two names (their original name and a name given by the Japanese government). Under this law, Zainichi Koreans had to reveal their identity to the public because when they visited the city hall to provide their fingerprints, their neighbors found out that they were Zainichi Koreans. Therefore, Zainichi Koreans were forced to reveal their identity to Japanese and faced discrimination from them. This made their lives even more difficult. In order to protect themselves, many Zainichi Koreans protested against this law. Mindan and many Zainichi Koreans opposed this law, but the law wasn't repealed until 1993. Until then, Zainichi Koreans could not escape from the social discrimination which they had faced in Japanese society.

Furthermore, it was hard for the Zainichi Koreans to get a job due to discrimination. Especially, it was very hard for Zainichi Koreans to become public employees since Japan only let Japanese nationals become public employees at that time. Since many Zainichi Koreans couldn't get a proper job, they began to get involved in illegal jobs such as "illegal alcohol production, scrap recycling, and racketeering" (Min). As a result, many Zainichi Koreans ended up living in slums or hamlets since Japanese real estate agents refused to let Zainichi Koreans rent houses.

Zainichi today have established a stable presence in Japan after years of activism. Through Mintohren, community support by Zainichi organizations (Mindan, Chongryon, among others), other minority groups (Ainu, Burakumin, Ryūkyūans, Nivkhs and others), and sympathetic Japanese, they have improved the social atmosphere for Zainichi in Japan. There are also Koreans living in Japan who try to present themselves as Japanese to avoid discrimination. Most younger Zainichi now speak only Japanese, go to Japanese schools, work for Japanese firms and increasingly now marry Japanese. Most naturalization occurs among the young during the period when they seek formal employment or marriage. Those who have already established their life often choose to retain their South Korean or Joseon nationality as part of their heritage.

Assimilation

One of the most pressing issues of the Zainichi community is the rate of assimilation of Zainichi into Japan. About 4,000 to 5,000 Koreans naturalize in Japan every year out of slightly less than 480,000.
One crucial aspect of naturalisation for Zainichi Korean is that both Mindan and Chongryon link Korean ethnic identity to Korean nationality (Japanese and South Korean nationality laws do not allow multiple citizenship for adults). By their definition, opting for a Japanese passport means becoming a Japanese, rather than a Korean Japanese. In order to be naturalized as Japanese citizens, Zainichi Koreans had to go through multiple, complex steps. In order for Zainichi Koreans to complete these steps, they were required to collect information about their family and ancestors that stretched ten generations. They could collect this information if they paid money to an organization such as Mindan, however with prohibitively expensive cost, so many were unable to afford such information. However, these processes became much easier as time passed and today, it is easier for Zainichi Koreans to naturalize into Japanese citizens. Though there are a few cases of celebrities who naturalize with their Korean name, the majority of Zainichi Koreans formally choose a name that is both read and appears ethnically Japanese. This means that the rate of naturalisation can be taken as a rough measure of assimilation.

During post-World War II period many Zainichi Koreans married with other Zainichi Koreans and it was a rare case for them to marry with Japanese citizens. This was because Japanese citizens had a xenophobic prejudice against Zainichi Koreans due to the stigma stemming from decades of discrimination. Therefore, Japanese citizens, especially the parents were refusing marriage with Zainichi Koreans. However, there were also some problems about marriage between Zainichi Koreans too. As stated in the previous section, Zainichi Koreans were hiding their identity and living as a Japanese citizens at that time. Because of this, it was very hard for Zainichi Koreans to know of other people who had the same nationality as them. They were married mostly through arranged marriages supported by Mindan.
Tong-il Ilbo or Tōitsu Nippō, a Korean Japanese newspaper, reported that according to statistics from the Japanese Health and Labour ministry, there were 8,376 marriages between Japanese and Koreans. Compared to 1,971 marriages in 1965, when the statistics began, the number has roughly quadrupled and it now constitutes about 1% of the 730,971 total marriages in Japan. The highest number of marriages between Japanese men and Korean women was 8,940, in 1990. Since 1991, it has fluctuated around 6,000. On the other hand, there were 2,335 marriages between Korean men and Japanese women in 2006. It has been stable since the number reached 2,000, in 1984.

In 1975, Hidenori Sakanaka ( Sakanaka Hidenori), a bureaucrat in the Ministry of Justice, published a highly controversial document known as the "Sakanaka Paper". He stated that the assertion by both Mindan and Chongryon that Zainichi are destined to eventually return to Korea is no longer realistic. He further predicted that Zainichi would naturally disappear in the 21st century unless they abandon their link between Korean identity and Korean nationality. He argued that the Japanese government should stop treating Zainichi as temporary residents (with a special status) and start providing a proper legal framework for their permanent settlement as "Korean Japanese".

In December 1995, Gendai Korea (Modern Korea) published "20 years after the Sakanaka Paper" to assess further development. Sakanaka pointed out that in the 1980s, 50% of Zainichi Koreans married Japanese and in the 1990s, the rate was 80%. (In fact, he quoted only 15%-18% Korean marriage during 1990 to 1994.) He also pointed out the change in the law in 1985, which granted Japanese citizenship to a child with either parent being Japanese. (Previous laws granted citizenship only to a child with a Japanese father.) In practice, this would mean that less than 20% of Zainichi marriages would result in Zainichi status. As naturalisation is concentrated among the younger generation, the Zainichi population is expected to collapse once the older generation starts to die out in two decades.

The latest figure from Mindan showed that the total population of Zainichi was 598,219 in 2006 and 593,489 in 2007; only 8.9% married another Zainichi in 2006. There were 1,792 births and 4,588 deaths resulting in a 2,796 natural decrease. On top of that, there were 8,531 naturalisations, which resulted in a total decrease of 11,327 in 2006 (1.89%).

Registration of residents
After Zainichi Koreans lost Japanese nationality, the Immigration Control Act of 1951 and the Alien Registration Law of 1952 required them to be fingerprinted and to carry a certificate of registration as other foreigners did. The Permanent Residents by Accord of 1965 allowed Zainichi Koreans who had lived in Japan since the colonial period to apply for permanent residency, but their descendants could not. Twenty-six years later, the Japanese Diet passed the Special Law on Immigration Control and categorized Zainichi Koreans who have lived without any gap since the end of World War II or before and their lineal descendants as Special Permanent Residents. The fingerprint requirement for Zainichi Koreans was terminated by 1993.

Right to vote and government employment
Long-term ethnic Korean residents of Japan who have not taken up Japanese nationality currently have the legal status of Tokubetsu Eijusha ("Special Permanent Residents") and are granted special rights and privileges compared to other foreigners, especially in matters such as re-entry and deportation statutes. These privileges were originally given to residents with South Korean nationality in 1965, and were extended in 1991 to cover those who have retained their Joseon nationality.

Over the decades, Zainichi Koreans have been campaigning to regain their Japanese citizenship rights without having to adopt Japanese nationality. The right to claim social welfare benefits was granted in 1954, followed by access to the national health insurance structures (1960s) and state pensions (1980s). There is some doubt over the legality of some of these policies as the Public Assistance Law, which governs social welfare payments, is seen to apply to "Japanese nationals".

There had been a discussion about Zainichi South Koreans' right to vote in South Korea. Since Special Permanent Residents are exempted from military service and taxes, the South Korean government was reluctant to give them the right to vote, arguing they did not register as residents though it thought most people agree on granting the right to vote to short-stay South Korean travelers. On the other hand, Zainichi South Koreans claimed that they should be granted it because the Constitution of South Korea guarantees anyone having South Korean nationality the right to vote. In 2007, the Constitutional Court of Korea concluded all South Korean nationals don't have the right to vote in South Korea if they are permanent residents of other countries.

Zainichi North Koreans are allowed to vote and theoretically eligible to stand in North Korea's show elections if they are 17 years old or older.

There have also been campaigns to allow Zainichi Koreans to take up government employment and participate in elections, which are open to Japanese nationals only. Since 1992, Mindan has been campaigning for the right to vote in elections for prefectural and municipal assemblies, mayors and prefecture governors, backed by the South Korean government. In 1997, Kawasaki became the first municipality to hire a Korean national. So far, three prefectures – Osaka, Nara and Kanagawa – have supported voting rights for permanent foreign residents.

However, the Japanese Diet has not yet passed a resolution regarding this matter despite several attempts by a section within Liberal Democratic Party of Japan to do so, and there is considerable public and political opposition against granting voting rights to those who have not yet adopted Japanese nationality. Instead, the requirements for naturalization has been steadily lowered for Zainichi to the point that only criminal records or affiliation to North Korea would be a hindrance for naturalization. Both Zainichi organisations oppose this, as both organisations see naturalization as de facto assimilation. In November 2011, the South Korean government moved to register Zainichi Koreans as voters in South Korean elections, a move which attracted few registrants. While Mindan-affiliated Zainichi Koreans have pressed for voting rights in Japan, they have very little interest in becoming a voting bloc in South Korean politics. Chongryon for its part opposes moves to allow Zainichi Koreans to participate in Japanese politics, on the grounds that they assimilate Koreans into Japanese society and thus weaken Korean ethnic identity.

Korean schools

The pro-Pyongyang Chongryon operates 218 Chōsen gakkō (Korean: , Hanja: ,) across Japan, including kindergartens and one university. All lessons, and all conversations within the school are conducted in Korean. They teach a strong pro-North Korean ideology and allegiance to Kim Il-sung, Kim Jong-il and Kim Jong-un. The textbooks include an idealized depiction of the economic development of North Korea and Songun policy of Kim Jong-il.

One of the issues is funding. The schools were originally set up and run with support from the North Korean government but this money has now dried up, and with dropping pupil numbers, many schools are facing financial difficulties. The Japanese government has refused Chongryon's requests that it fund ethnic schools in line with regular Japanese schools, citing Article 89 of the Japanese Constitution, where use of public funds for education by non-public bodies is prohibited. In reality the schools are in fact partly funded by local authorities, but subsidies are given in the form of special benefits paid to the families of pupils, as opposed to paying the schools directly, in order to avoid a blatant breach of Article 89. It is also much less than the amount received by state schools.

Another issue is an examination called the High School Equivalency Test, or daiken, which qualifies those who have not graduated from a regular high school to apply for a place in a state university and take an entrance exam. Until recently, only those who have completed compulsory education (i.e. up to junior high school) were entitled to take daiken; this meant pupils of ethnic schools had to do extra courses before being allowed to take the exam. In 1999 the requirement was amended so that anyone over a certain age is qualified. Campaigners were not satisfied because this still meant graduates of non-Japanese high schools had to take daiken. In 2003, the Education Ministry removed the requirement to take the Equivalency Test from graduates of Chinese schools, Mindan-run Korean schools and international schools affiliated with Western nations and accredited by U.S. and British organizations. However, this did not apply to graduates of pro-Pyongyang Korean schools, saying it could not approve their curricula. The decision was left up to individual universities, 70% of which allowed Korean school graduates to apply directly.

Due to issues described above, the number of students at Korean schools run by Chongryon has declined by 67%, and many of the children of Zainichi Koreans choose to go to orthodox Japanese schools.

In contrast, there are few Kankoku Gakkō (Korean: ,) located in Tokyo, Osaka, Ibaraki, Kyoto and Ishioka, they get sponsorship from South Korea and are operated by Mindan. Koreans who live in Japan supporting South Korea are likely to attend a Kankoku gakkō. Alternatively, they can go to a normal school in Japan with Japanese when there is no Kankoku gakkō in their area. Most Koreans who have lived in Japan since they were born, however, go to normal schools even if there is a Kankoku gakkō near them.

Legal alias

Traditionally, Zainichi Koreans have used Japanese-style names in public, but some Zainichi Koreans, including celebrities and professional athletes, use their original Korean names. Well-known ethnic Koreans who use Japanese names include Hanshin Tigers star Tomoaki Kanemoto, pro wrestlers Riki Choshu and Akira Maeda, and controversial judoka and mixed martial artist Yoshihiro Akiyama.

During the Korea-Japan 2002 World Cup, a Mindan newspaper conducted a survey regarding the use of aliases. Fifty percent of those polled said that they always only use an alias, while thirteen percent stated they use their original name. Thirty-three percent stated that they use either depending on the situation. In another survey, over 90% of ethnic Koreans in Japan have a Japanese-sounding name in addition to a Korean one. Eighty percent stated that they used their Japanese names when in Japanese company, and 30.3% stated that they used their Japanese names "almost exclusively".

Zainichi in the Japanese labor market
Zainichi Koreans are said to mainly engage in pachinko parlors, restaurants/bars, and construction. Discrimination against Zainichi Koreans in hiring pushed them into so-called 3D (dirty, dangerous, and demeaning) industries. Annual sales of pachinko had been about 30 trillion yen since 1993, and Zainichi Koreans and Chongryon accounted for 90% of such sales. However, the pachinko industry is shrinking, because the Japanese government has imposed stricter regulations. The number of pachinko parlors decreased by 9.5% between 2012 and 2016, while the number of people playing pachinko dropped to less than 9.4 million.

Some Zainichi Koreans have developed yakiniku restaurants. The honorary president of the All Japan "Yakiniku" Association is Tae Do Park (alias: Taido Arai).

In the 1970s, newcomers started to enter the precious metal industry. Currently, 70% of precious metal products are made by certified Zainichi Koreans.

Some Zainichi Koreans participate in organized crime, as do some people in other segments of the population. A former member of Sumiyoshi-kai estimates there are a few hundred Korean yakuza, and that some of them are bosses of branches. However, Korean gang members tend to go to China and Southeast Asia, as these countries are more lucrative for them than Japan.

There has been improvement in the field of the working rights of Zainichi Koreans since the 1970s. For example, foreigners including Zainichi Koreans were not allowed to become lawyers in Japan, but Kim Kyung Deok became the first Zainichi Korean lawyer in 1979.  As of 2018, there are more than 100 Zainichi Korean lawyers in Japan, and some of them have worked as a member of LAZAK (Lawyers Association of Zainichi Koreans).

In popular culture 

The earliest Japanese films featuring Koreans in Japan often depicted Koreans as members of the peripheral society, rather than as main characters. It wasn't until after the Second World War that films visualized the struggles and oppression experienced by Zainichi Koreans, with films such as Three Resurrected Drunkards (1968) by Nagisa Ōshima, which addressed the bigotry and xenophobia experienced by Zainichi in Japan. The first film to present the Zainichi experience from a Zainichi director was the 1975 film River of the Stranger by Lee Hak-in.

Zainichi director Sai Yoichi's All Under the Moon was the first to receive critical acclaim, earning several best film awards in 1993. In 2000, Zainichi author Kazuki Kaneshiro's Naoki Prize winning book Go would be made into a popular film of the same name, and Zainichi director Lee Sang-il would release his first film, Chong. Yang Yong-hi would be the first to address the Chongryon experience, with her documentary Dear Pyongyang in 2005.

Korean American creatives have used the Zainichi experience to parse their own experience as part of the greater Korean diaspora, with films such as Benson Lee's 2016 film Seoul Searching, and author Min Jin Lee's 2017 novel Pachinko, which has been made into a limited series of the same name by Apple TV+.

Notable people

See also

 Koreatowns in Japan
 Sōshi-kaimei
 Kantō Massacre
 Shinano River incident
 Demography of Japan
 Ethnic issues in Japan
 Japan–Korea disputes
 Japanese people in South Korea
 List of Koreans in Japan
 History of Japan–Korea relations
 Anti-Korean sentiment in Japan
 Hanshin Education Incident
 Koma Shrine
 Koryo-Saram

Other ethnic groups in Japan
 Ryukyuan people
 Ainu people
 Yamato people

References

Further reading

External links

 FCCJ (The Foreign Correspondents' Club of Japan) Mr. Suganuma of former Public Security Investigation Agency tells it about Zainichi Korean (Japanese, English)
 South Korean Residents Union in Japan (Mindan) (Korean, Japanese, English)
 History of Mindan (English)
 Online Newspaper covering Zainichi Korean and Mindan (English)
 The Federation of Korean Associations, Japan (Korean, Japanese)
 North Korean Residents Union in Japan (Joseon Chongryon) (Korean, Japanese)
 Selection of articles on Koreans in Japan from pro-DPRK "People's Korea"
 The Han World – a site for Korean residents in Japan.
 The Self-Identities of Zainichi Koreans – a paper on Zainichi.
 MINTOHREN: Young Koreans Against Ethnic Discrimination in Japan
 Panel discussion in San Francisco Nichi Bei Times Article
 Testing Tolerance: Fallout from North Korea's Nuclear Program Hits Minorities in Japan article from The Common Language Project
 Japan Times: "Young 'Zainichi' Koreans look beyond Chongryon ideology"
 "From Korea to Kyoto; Chapter One of Community, Democracy, and Performance: the Urban Practice of Kyoto's Higashi-Kujo Madang
 Migration patterns of Korean residents in Ikuno ward, Osaka ― Japanese Journal of Human Geography (人文地理)

Ethnic groups in Japan
Immigration to Japan
Japan–Korea relations